Gaganpur is a village of Patnitala Upazila of Naogaon District in the Division of Rajshahi, Bangladesh. Gaganpur postal code is 6540.

Transport
6.5 km east of Patnitala Sadar is adjacent to Gaganpur Bazar on Gaganpur-Nazipur road. Rickshaws, vans, CNG, etc.

Education

Secondary schools
 Gaganpur High School

Colleges
 Gaganpur Technical and Business Management College

Madrasas
 Gaganpur Wazedia Fazil (Degree) Madrasah
 Hazrat Molla Ata Hafizia Madrasah

Hospitals
 Gaganpur Health Complex, Gaganpur, Patnitala Upazila, Naogaon District

See also
 Somapura Mahavihara (Paharpur)
 Nazipur

References

External links 
 
 

Populated places in Rajshahi Division